Mink Martin Peeters (born 28 May 1998) is a Dutch footballer who plays as a forward.

Club career
Born in Nijmegen, Peeters started his youth career with academy of PSV Eindhoven in 2007. Four years later, he switched to AFC Ajax. As he progressed through the C1, B2 and B1 teams, he attracted the interest of foreign clubs including Atlético Madrid and Real Madrid. In 2014, he signed with Spanish club Real Madrid and was assigned to the youth team. While playing for the Juvenil A team, he went on to win the 2017 Copa de Campeones with the side, besides reaching the semifinal of the UEFA Youth League. Subsequently, his contract was extended by three years at the end of the season.

On 19 August 2017, Peeters was loaned out to Dutch Eredivisie club VVV-Venlo for the remainder of the season. Because of contractual transfer issues, and physical problems (Pfeiffer's disease) his entrance at VVV-Venlo was anything but prosperous. On 21 September, he made his competitive debut, playing the whole 90 minutes of a KNVB Cup match against Blauw Geel '38. In November, he was suspended by manager Maurice Steijn for three days because he trained outside the club without its permission. Without having featured any further for VVV-Venlo, Peeters left the club at the end of January 2018.

Peeters joined second tier Eerste Divisie club Almere City on loan for the remainder of the season on 28 January 2018. Because of acute appendicitis he first was able to attend the training of his new club after two months. On 2 April, he made his debut in a 4–0 victory against RKC Waalwijk.

On 10 August 2018, he was loaned to Lleida for the 2018–19 season, but because of financial transfer issues he was not able to play for Lleida for a couple of months. He next returned to Real Madrid (Real Madrid Castilla, actually) in January 2019, but he rescinded his contract with Los Blancos, in consultation, because loan regulations prohibited him to play for Real Madrid Castilla anymore.

On 5 August 2019 Peeters signed a 3-year contract with Serbian club FK Čukarički. He had arrived at Belgrade-based club immediately at the start of the preparations for new season, however, an injury delayed his signing and participation in the club's 2019–20 UEFA Europa League qualifiers. Peeters left FK Čukarički after five months without ever playing a game for them. Shortly after leaving  Čukarički, Peeters signed a one-year contract with FC Volendam who are competing in the Eerste Divisie.

International career
Peeters has been capped by the under-15, under-16, under-17, Netherlands U18 and under-20 teams. He represented the under-17 team in 2015 UEFA European Under-17 Championship.

Career statistics

References

External links

1998 births
Living people
Association football forwards
Dutch footballers
Real Madrid CF players
VVV-Venlo players
Almere City FC players
Lleida Esportiu footballers
Eredivisie players
Eerste Divisie players
Netherlands youth international footballers
Expatriate footballers in Spain
Footballers from Nijmegen
FK Čukarički players
Expatriate footballers in Serbia
FC Volendam players
Dutch expatriate sportspeople in Spain
Dutch expatriate sportspeople in Serbia